Einar Eriksen (3 March 1880 – 15 July 1965) was a Norwegian rowing coxswain. He competed in the men's coxed four event at the 1912 Summer Olympics. His brother Bjarne competed at the same Olympics in fencing.

References

1880 births
1965 deaths
Norwegian male rowers
Olympic rowers of Norway
Rowers at the 1912 Summer Olympics
Sportspeople from Trondheim
Coxswains (rowing)